The , also known by the titles Cancionero del Duque de Calabria and Cancionero de Venecia, is a volume of mostly anonymous Spanish music printed in Venice in 1556. Its actual title is Villancicos de diversos Autores, a dos, y a tres, y a quatro, y a cinco bozes, agora nuevamente corregidos. Ay mas ocho tonos de Canto llano, y ocho tonos de Canto de Organo para que puedan aprovechar los que A cantar començaren. Venetiis, Apud Hieronymum Scotum, MDLVI. It survives in a unique copy at the Uppsala University Library and was edited in 1909 by Rafael Mitjana; the subsequent literature has mostly adopted his spelling "Upsala" ("Upsala" being the historic Swedish spelling of "Uppsala" until the major spelling reform of 1906). A facsimile was first published by Alamire (Peer, Belgium 1984) and later by the Biblioteca Valenciana (Valencia, Spain 2003).

Contents

Villancicos a dos bozes (for two voices)

Villancicos a tres bozes (for three voices)

Villancicos a quatro bozes (for four voices)

Villancicos de Navidad a quatro bozes (Christmas villancicos for four voices)

Villancicos de Navidad a tres bozes (Christmas villancicos for three voices)

Villancicos a cinco bozes (for five voices)

External links

Digital copy of Cancionero de Upsala from Uppsala University Library

Music books
Renaissance music manuscript sources
Spanish music